A pole marquee  or pole tent is a variety of large tent often used to shelter summer events such as shows, festivals, and weddings. They are particularly associated with typical English country garden weddings and village fetes.

The simple design has changed little in thousands of years. A pole marquee consists of a roof canopy supported by tall central poles ("king poles") tensioned using side lines connected to ground pins (or stakes) and smaller supporting poles ("side poles"). The king poles support the bulk of the weight, while the side poles give the fabric shape.

Originally, they were manufactured from cotton canvas covers, wooden poles, and hessian rope but they have been largely replaced with more modern materials. In the United Kingdom, hire companies offer "American-style" pole tents with PVC covers, aluminium poles, and nylon ropes. The introduction of modern fabrics extends the shelf life of the marquees, as they are far more easily cleaned. Canvas marquees are still available and in recent years have been having a resurgence as natural materials are appreciated again.  One of the benefits of canvas is that it is more breathable compared to PVC (which traps the air and raises the temperature inside it); such a marquee is more comfortable in hot summer weather while remaining watertight in the event of rain.

References
Performance Textiles Association - A Useful Guide to Marquees

External links

Portable buildings and shelters